Jacqui Marshall (born 13 March 1957) is an Australian rower. She competed in the women's single sculls event at the 1984 Summer Olympics.

References

1957 births
Living people
Australian female rowers
Olympic rowers of Australia
Rowers at the 1984 Summer Olympics
Place of birth missing (living people)
20th-century Australian women